Telugu Brahmins are Brahmin communities native to the Indian states of Andhra Pradesh and Telangana.

History

Origin theories
According to the Aitareya Brahmana of the Rigveda, the Andhras left north India from the banks of the River Yamuna around 800 BCE and migrated into peninsular India. Telugu Brahmins are also called Andhras.

Classification
Telugu Brahmins fall under the Pancha Dravida Brahmin classification of the Brahmin community in India.

The Brahmins of Andhra Pradesh and Telangana mainly include Vaidikis, Niyogis, Deshasthas, Telugu Madhvas, Golkanda Vyaparis, Dravidulu. They are divided on the basis of Vedic traditions that they follow such as Smartha, Madhva, and Sri Vaishnava.

Vaidikis and Niyogis are mainly Smarthas, while Sri Vaishnavas and Telugu Madhvas are Telugu Brahmins who converted to Ramanuja and Madhvacharya faith respectively. Telugu Madhvas and Deshastha Madhvas are mainly followers of Uttaradi Matha, Raghavendra Matha and Vyasaraja Matha, While Telugu Smarthas are followers of either Kanchi Kamakoti Peetham or Sringeri Sharada Peetham. Telugu Sri Vaishnava brahmin form a single distinct sect called Andhra Vaishnava and are not sub-divided into Tenkalai and Vadakalai unlike their Dravidian Iyengar counterparts. Deshastha Brahmins are mainly divided into two groups Deshastha Madhva Brahmins and Deshastha Smartha Brahmins. In Telangana, Deshastha Brahmins are spread throughout all the districts of the state, while in Andhra Pradesh, they are mainly concentrated in the districts of Kurnool, Anantapur, Kadapa, Chittoor, Nellore, Krishna, Guntur, East Godavari and West Godavari, especially in the cities of Kurnool, Anantapur, Kadapa, Chittore, Nellore, Rajahmundry, Guntur and Hyderabad. Marriage alliance between Deshastha Brahmins, other Telugu Brahmins and Karnataka Brahmins takes place quite frequently. The Dravidulu are migrants from Tamil Nadu.

Occupation

During the Medieval & Modern India
Niyogi Brahmins served as village record keepers (karnams), poets, and sometimes ministers. Deshastha Brahmins also served as village record keepers (karnams) but the majority of them served as high-level administrators and bureaucrats such as Deshmukhs, Sheristadars, Tehsildars, Deshpandes and Majumdars under Qutb shahis of Golkonda and Nizams of Hyderabad in Andhra Pradesh and Telangana. Niyogi Brahmins and Deshastha Brahmins also ruled Andhra Pradesh as Zamindars. In Guntur district, two out of five Zamindars i.e., Chilkalurpet Zamindari and Sattanapalli Zamindari were ruled by Deshastha Madhva Brahmins, whose title was "Deshmukh". The Polavaram Zamindari of West Godavari district and Lakkavaram Zamindari of Prakasham district were ruled by Niyogi Brahmins. Due to their secular occupations marriage alliances between Deshastha Brahmins, Golkonda Vyapari Brahmins and Niyogi Brahmins was very common since centuries. Vaidiki Brahmins and Dravidulu are priests and teachers.

Population distribution
According to 1921 Census of India, In Telugu states (combined both Andhra Pradesh and Telangana) Brahmins constitute three percent of total population.
According to a survey by Outlook India in 2003, Brahmins were estimated to be around 5% of Telugu states population (combined both Andhra Pradesh and Telangana).

Notable people

Religious leaders
 Nimbarkacharya, Hindu philosopher, theologian and the chief proponent of Dvaitadvaita or dualistic–non-dualistic.

Social Activists
 Pingali Venkayya, Designer of Indian National Flag, theologian.
 Kandukuri Veeresalingam, Father of the Telugu Renaissance movement.
 Goparaju Ramachandra Rao, Indian social reformer, atheist activist and a participant in the Indian independence movement.
 Burgula Ramakrishna Rao, First Indian land reformer.He eradicated the system of jagirdar and mukthedar in Telangana and introduced the law of tenancy.
 Iyyanki Venkata Ramanayya, Architect of the Public Library Movement in India, Padmasri Awardee.

Politics
 K. B. Hedgewar, the founder and the first Sarsanghchalak of the Rashtriya Swayamsevak Sangh (RSS).
 Madhukar Dattatraya Deoras, the third Sarsanghchalak of the Rashtriya Swayamsevak Sangh (RSS).
 Bhogaraju Pattabhi Sitaramayya, freedom fighter, President of the Indian National Congress and founder of Andhra Bank. 
N. Subba Rao Pantulu, an Indian social reformer, a politician, served as a member of the Madras Legislative Council and one of the founders of The Hindu.
 P. V. Narasimha Rao, an Indian lawyer and politician who served as the 9th Prime Minister of India from 1991 to 1996. 
Varahagiri Venkatagiri (V. V. Giri), an Indian Lawyer and former President of India.
Tanguturi Prakasam, lawyer and freedom fighter, known as "The Lion of Andhra" during the British Raj, who served as first chief minister of Andhra state.
 Pramod Mahajan - BJP politician, former Minister of Communications, Information Technology and Parliamentary Affairs.

Bureaucrats
P. V. R. K. Prasad, an Indian civil servant who served as Media Advisor to the Prime Minister of India, P. V. Narasimha Rao from 1991 to 1996.

P.V. Rajgopal,IPS, Director   SVP National Police Academy,  from 1998 to 2001.

Literature 
 Viswanatha Satyanarayana, poet, novelist
Divakarla Tirupati Sastry, poet and scholar
Devulapalli Krishnasastri, poet, playwright and translator
Chittamuru Ramaiah, Telugu Theosophist

Music
 S. P. Balasubrahmanyam, Indian playback singer.
Acharya Pandit Dr.Gokulotsavji Maharaj, Hindustani Classical Music and Ancient Indian Musical Styles veteran, singer
Mangalampalli Bala Murli Krishna, Carnatic singer
Nookala Chinna Satyanarayana, Carnatic singer

Films 
Krishna Kumari, an Indian actress.
Sowcar Janaki, an Indian actress.
Bapu, Film director
Mullapudi Venkata Ramana, Writer
K. Viswanath, Film Director
Jandhyala, Director, Writer
Akella Trivikram Srinivas, Film Director, Writer
Indraganti Mohana Krishna, Film Director, Writer
Tanikella Bharani, Film Director, Writer, Actor
Gollapudi Maruti Rao, Actor, screenwriter, dramatist and playwright
Veturi, lyricist
Sri Sirivennela Seetharama Sastry, lyricist
Ramajogayya Sastry, Lyricist
Bhaskarabhatla, Lyricist
Jonnavittula Ramalingeswara Rao, Lyricist
Srimani, Lyricist
Sirasri, Lyricist
Kasarla Shyam, Lyricist
Sahiti, Lyricist
Rallapalli Venkata Narasimha Rao, Actor
Chandra Mohan, Actor
Subhalekha Sudhakar, Actor
Sai Kumar, Actor
Aadi Pudipeddi, Actor
Ananth Babu, Actor
Laya (actress), Actress, Dancer
Sobhita Dhulipala, Actress

Notes

References

Bibliography

External links 
 Brahmins of Andhra Pradesh

Brahmin communities across India
Social groups of Andhra Pradesh
Brahmin communities of Andhra Pradesh